Paul Dawber is a British born-Australian stage, film and television actor. He attended drama school at National Theatre, Melbourne and graduated in 1987. That same year, he played the role of Todd Buckley in Sons and Daughters. He has appeared in Australian police dramas such as Blue Heelers, Stingers, City Homicide, and Satisfaction. Dawber has also made appearances in Prisoner, and The Flying Doctors. He has played the recurring roles of Mr. Denning, Kim Howard, and Harry Sinclair in the soap opera Neighbours. Dawber has appeared in a dozen feature films, including the lead role in The Novelist in 2017. In 2019, he toured Australia, New Zealand and Germany with the Opera Australia production of West Side Story in the role of Lt. Schrank.

Filmography

Film

Television

References

External links
 

Living people
Australian male television actors
1956 births